Velachery is a state assembly constituency in Tamil Nadu, India, that was formed after constituency delimitation in 2007. Its State Assembly Constituency number is 26. It forms a part of the Chennai South parliamentary constituency for national elections.
It is one of the 234 State Legislative Assembly Constituencies in Tamil Nadu.

Members of Legislative Assembly

Election results

2021

2016

2011

References

Assembly constituencies of Tamil Nadu
Politics of Chennai